OK Častkovce is a Slovak football team, based in the village of Častkovce.

Current squad

Current technical staff
As of 5 March 2023

References

External links
Official club website 
OK Častkovce facebook 

Sport in Trenčín Region
Football clubs in Slovakia